Daryl Cardiss (born 13 July 1978) is an NZ former professional rugby league footballer who played in the 1990s and 2000s. He also went on to play for the Widnes Vikings, Oldham (Heritage № 1223) and the Batley Bulldogs.

References

External links
Statistics at wigan.rlfans.com
Statistics at rugby.widnes.tv

1978 births
Living people
Batley Bulldogs players
Halifax R.L.F.C. players
New Zealand rugby league players
Oldham R.L.F.C. players
Rugby league fullbacks
Rugby league players from Leeds
Warrington Wolves players
Widnes Vikings players
Wigan Warriors players
Yorkshire rugby league team players